Alexandru Papiu-Ilarian (27 September 1827 – ) was a Romanian revolutionary, lawyer and historian.

Papiu Ilarian was born in Bezded, Kingdom of Hungary (today part of Gârbou, Romania) on 27 September 1827. His father was the Greek-catholic priest Ioan Bucur Pop, also a Romanian revolutionary, who was executed at Turda by hanging, at 54 years old, by the Hungarian authorities in March 1849. In 1832 he moved with his family to Budiu de Câmpie, near Târgu Mureș, the native village of his father. where he attends the primary school. In the autumn of 1838 he enters the Catholic secondary school in Târgu Mureş. He finished high school in Cluj. He was active in the Hungarian Revolution of 1848.

He was a founder and president of the Transylvania Society, between 1867 and 1874. He was elected to the Romanian Academy in 1868. As member of the Bar in Bucharest, he pleaded in court the case of the oxcart drivers from Giurgiu, in 1873. He died in Sibiu on 23 October 1877, and is buried at the Church between the Fir trees.

References

External links
Encyclopedia of 1848 Revolutions: Alexandru Papiu Ilarian
Colegiul National "Alexandru Papiu Ilarian" Tg-Mures: Alexandru Papiu Ilarian

1827 births
1877 deaths
People of the Revolutions of 1848
Romanian revolutionaries
19th-century Romanian lawyers
Titular members of the Romanian Academy
Romanian Greek-Catholics
People from Sălaj County
Romanian Ministers of Control
Austrian Empire emigrants to Romania